Victoria (minor planet designation: 12 Victoria) is a large main-belt asteroid, orbiting the Sun with a period of 3.56 years and an eccentricity of 0.221. It is a stony (S-type) asteroid, about 112–124 km across with an albedo of 0.18 and a rotation period of 8.66 hours. Victoria has been observed to occult a star three times since its discovery. Radar and speckle interferometry observations show that the shape of Victoria is elongated, and it is suspected to be a binary asteroid, with a moon of irregular shape.

This minor planet was discovered by English astronomer J. R. Hind on September 13, 1850. Victoria is officially named after the Roman goddess of victory, but the name also honours Queen Victoria. The goddess Victoria (Nike for the Greeks) was the daughter of Styx by the Titan Pallas. The coincidence with the name of the then-reigning queen caused quite a controversy at the time, and B. A. Gould, editor of the prestigious Astronomical Journal, adopted the alternate name Clio (now used by 84 Klio), proposed by the discoverer. However, W. C. Bond, of the Harvard College Observatory, then the highest authority on astronomy in America, held that the mythological condition was fulfilled and the name therefore acceptable, and his opinion eventually prevailed.

See also
 Former classification of planets

References

External links 
  (displays Elong from Sun and V mag for 2011)
 
 

S-type asteroids (Tholen)
L-type asteroids (SMASS)
Klio asteroids
Victoria
Victoria
18500913